Play to Win is the fourth studio album by the British singer Gabrielle. It was the 191st best-selling album of 2004. The album's American-style country music flavours are a departure from Gabrielle's usual R&B–pop style.

The track "Sometimes" from this album appears on the Love Actually film soundtrack.

Track listing

Charts

Certifications

References

2004 albums
Gabrielle (singer) albums
Albums produced by Richard Stannard (songwriter)
Country albums by English artists